Charlee Shaun Adams (born 16 February 1995) is an English professional footballer who plays as a midfielder for  club Maidenhead United.

Adams began his football career in West Ham United's youth system, and moved in to Birmingham City in 2011. He made his first-team debut for Birmingham in the FA Cup in January 2014, appeared 28 times in the Conference Premier in two spells on loan at Lincoln City, and spent the first half of the 2016–17 campaign on loan at Scottish Premiership club Kilmarnock, before being released at the end of that season. He then played National League football for Dagenham & Redbridge (two spells) and Barnet before joining Maidenhead United in 2021.

Life and career
Adams was born in Redbridge, London, and attended Cumberland School in nearby Newham. As a youngster he was on the books of his local club, West Ham United, but after a trial at the end of the 2010–11 season, he and fellow West Ham trainee Kortney Hause joined Birmingham City's academy. He maintained a blog on the League Football Education website about the progress of his two-year scholarship.

In May 2013, he signed a one-year professional contract with an option for a further year. With Tom Adeyemi injured and Hayden Mullins needed in defence, Adams was given squad number 34 ahead of the Championship visit to Brighton & Hove Albion on 11 January 2014. He travelled as a reserve, but was not part of the matchday squad. Adams was included among the substitutes for Birmingham's FA Cup third-round match against Bristol Rovers three days later, and made his first-team debut as an 89th-minute replacement for Olly Lee with Birmingham 3–0 ahead.

On 31 January, he joined Conference Premier club Lincoln City on loan until the end of the season. He went straight into the starting eleven for the following day's match and played the full 90 minutes as Lincoln beat FC Halifax Town 3–1. According to the Lincolnshire Echo, he "excelled playing in a defensive midfield role. He ratted about and read the game brilliantly to give the City back four the best protection they have had in a long time." He played regularly until the end of the season, and after failing to break into Birmingham's first team in the early part of the new season, returned to Lincoln on loan until 1 January 2015.

He again played regularly. By Christmas, the Echo described him as having "been different class since he arrived for his second loan spell", highlighting "the maturity and intelligence he shows on and off the ball" and "his ability to win the ball and get play going". In the local derby away to Grimsby Town, he scored his first senior goal, a powerful volleyed shot from distance that tied the scores and, according to the Grimsby Telegraph, "changed the complexion" of the match, which Lincoln went on to win 3–1. The goal was shortlisted for the Non-League Paper National Game Awards Goal of the Season. His loan was initially extended to the end of February, and then to the end of the season. On 3 March 2015, after Adams had played 15 times for Lincoln, he was recalled to Birmingham. Manager Gary Rowett felt his development would be better served by playing regularly in under-21 matches and training with the first team at his parent club, and his progress was rewarded with a new one-year contract with the option of a further year.

Adams made his first Football League appearance on 23 January 2016, as a stoppage-time substitute with Birmingham 3–0 up at home to Ipswich Town in the Championship. Within seconds of coming on, he produced a shot on target from outside the penalty area. In March, the club took up the year's option on Adams' contract. Adams made his first start for Birmingham in the last match of the 2015–16 season, partnering Maikel Kieftenbeld in central midfield away to Cardiff City.

In the face of competition from clubs in England, Adams was reunited with manager Lee Clark on 19 August 2016 when he signed for Scottish Premiership club Kilmarnock on loan until January 2017. He made his debut the following day in the starting eleven for a 2–0 away defeat against Ross County. In his third match, Adams had only been on the field for ten minutes when he was the victim of a late challenge by Dundee defender Kévin Gomis that left a wound through which his tibia was visible. He finished his spell on loan with nine appearances, all in the league. In his first training session after returning to Birmingham, Adams damaged his medial collateral ligament and was out for nearly three months. He was released when his contract expired at the end of the season.

Adams signed a two-year contract with National League club Dagenham & Redbridge ahead of the 2017–18 season.

On 20 March 2018, Adams made his debut for England C, the team that represents the country at non-league level, as a second-half substitute in a 3–2 win against their Welsh counterparts.

On 28 June 2018, Adams joined Barnet for an undisclosed fee. He left the club at the end of the 2019–20 season, having played 57 times, scoring two goals. Adams re-joined Dagenham & Redbridge on 10 October 2020 on a non-contract basis. His registration was terminated on 18 March 2021.

Adams signed for Maidenhead United in August 2021.

Career statistics

References

External links
 
 Adams's blog at the League Football Education website

1995 births
Living people
Footballers from the London Borough of Redbridge
English footballers
England semi-pro international footballers
Association football midfielders
West Ham United F.C. players
Birmingham City F.C. players
Lincoln City F.C. players
Kilmarnock F.C. players
Dagenham & Redbridge F.C. players
Barnet F.C. players
Maidenhead United F.C. players
National League (English football) players
English Football League players
Scottish Professional Football League players